Cooper is an electoral district of the Legislative Assembly in the Australian state of Queensland. It was created in the 2017 redistribution, and was won at that year's state election by Labor's Kate Jones. It was named after pioneer doctor Lilian Violet Cooper.

It largely covers the areas of the abolished electorate of Ashgrove. Located in Northern Brisbane, it consists of the suburbs of Enoggera Reservoir, The Gap, Bardon, Ashgrove, Red Hill, Paddington and Milton.

Members for Cooper

Election results

See also
 Electoral districts of Queensland
 Members of the Queensland Legislative Assembly by year
 :Category:Members of the Queensland Legislative Assembly by name

References

Electoral districts of Queensland